Haplolobus sarawakanus is a species of plant in the Burseraceae family. It is a tree endemic to Borneo.

References

sarawakanus
Endemic flora of Borneo
Trees of Borneo
Vulnerable plants
Taxonomy articles created by Polbot
Plants described in 1994